Alucita sikkima is a moth of the family Alucitidae. It is found in India (Sikkim).

References

Moths described in 1887
Alucitidae
Moths of Asia
Taxa named by Edward Meyrick